Miami Norland Senior High School is a public high school located in the Norland neighborhood of Miami Gardens, Florida.

History
Miami Norland Senior High School opened its doors to students in 1958 as an all-white school, accepting fifty students between grades seven through twelve. Nearby Miami Palmetto Senior High School was established at the same time and is considered a sister school. Miami Norland had a cost of $1,699,000. The expected enrollment was 2,250. Once Norland Junior High School opened across the street, grades 7-9 moved there. Miami Norland continued to have three grade levels (10th, 11th and 12th) until 1985, when grade 9 was added.

The first principal of Miami Norland, Foster Hunter, guided the school from its inception into the mid-1970s. For more than a decade, it was an all-white school; this changed in 1969, when all schools in Dade County were court-ordered to desegregate.

The original buildings of Miami Norland were demolished during the summer of 2016, after a new, more modern facility was built to replace the old facility. Prior to the teardown, the school hosted a walk-through for alumni to take a last look at the old building. The new building opened for classes on August 22, 2016, at the beginning of the 2016-17 school year. This new building was the last new facility for the northern Miami-Dade County high schools.

The school now offers an Academy of Fine Arts, Hospitality and Tourism and Teaching magnet programs.

Prior to the opening of North Miami Beach High School and Dr. Michael Krop High School, students from North Miami Beach were assigned to North Miami High School and Miami Norland High School.

It was in the Norland census-designated place, in an unincorporated area until Miami Gardens incorporated as a city on May 13, 2003.

Students are required to wear school uniform shirts in maroon, white or gray. They may wear solid maroon, gray, khaki, or black pants or shorts.

Demographics
Miami Norland is 95% Black, 4% Hispanic and 1% non-white Hispanic.

Athletics
Home of the Vikings, Miami Norland athletic teams wear the colors of maroon and gray, and compete within the Florida High School Athletic Association (FHSAA). The school offers a select few sports, including basketball, cross country, soccer, track and field, and volleyball. Boys-only sports are football and wrestling, while the lone girls-only sport is flag football.

The Miami Norland basketball and football teams have enjoyed success in recent years by winning a number of FHSAA championships. The girl's basketball team won in 2009, and the boys' basketball squad were victorious in 2006, 2008, 2012-15. They also competed in the 2014 and 2015 Battle at The Villages, but only achieved as high as second place. The football team won the 2002 and 2011 titles.

Notable faculty
James Coley (Football)
William Lehman (teacher)
John D Pace III (Band Director)
Sergio Rouco (Basketball)
Anthony E Simons III (Band Director)
Kenneth R Tolbert (Band Director)
John Varone (Football)
Lawton Williams (Basketball)

Notable alumni

Miami Norland has produced a number of professional athletes, especially National Football League (NFL) players. Most notably, the seven-time Pro Bowler and Super Bowl champion wide receiver Antonio Brown (2006), graduated from the school. Wide receiver Dwayne Bowe (2003) and cornerback Xavier Rhodes (2008) have also received Pro Bowl selections. Aside from Brown, only three other graduates have won a Super Bowl: Darrin Smith (1988), Mike McKenzie (1994), and Carlton Davis (2015).

Two of the earliest graduates to play in the NFL were Wilbur Summers (1973) and John Turner (1974). The next decade included Steve Griffin (1983) and Randy Shannon (1984). Graduates from the 2000s include: Kareem Brown (2001), Antwan Barnes (2003), Richard Gordon (2005), Travell Dixon (2009), and Tourek Williams (2009). Graduates from the 2010s include: Lestar Jean (2011), Ereck Flowers (2012), Duke Johnson (2012), and Vosean Joseph (2016).

Only one Miami Norland has went on to play in the National Basketball Association (NBA): Dewan Hernandez (2015). However, three have played in other professional basketball leagues: Amir Celestin (1990), Zachery Peacock (2006), and Antonio Hester (2009). Tombi Bell (1997) played in the Women's National Basketball Association (WNBA).

Gil Patterson (1974) played in Major League Baseball (MLB) and Bruce Savage (1978) was capped for the United States men's national soccer team. Athletes Tyrese Cooper and Tabarie Henry (2006) also graduated from Miami Norland.

Non-athletes include: the longest coma patient, Edwarda O'Bara (did not graduate), the educator Ronni Sanlo (1969), the criminal Daniel Conahan (1973), the judge Ian Richards (1993) and Roy Bellamy, producer of The Dan Le Batard Show with Stugotz (2002).

See also
List of high schools in Florida
List of United States high school national records in track and field
Miami-Dade County Public Schools

References

External links

Miami-Dade County Public Schools high schools
Miami Gardens, Florida
1958 establishments in Florida
Educational institutions established in 1958